Issa is the name of several inhabited localities in Russia.

Urban localities
Issa, Penza Oblast, a work settlement in Issinsky District of Penza Oblast

Rural localities
Issa, Pskov Oblast, a village in Pushkinogorsky District of Pskov Oblast